The 1995 Durham mayoral election was held on November 7, 1995 to elect the mayor of Durham, North Carolina. It saw the reelection of incumbent mayor Sylvia Kerckhoff.

Results

Primary 
The primary took place on October 10, 1995.

General election

References 

Durham
Mayoral elections in Durham, North Carolina
Durham